Kilconquhar railway station served the village of Kilconquhar, Fife, Scotland from 1857 to 1965 on the Leven and East of Fife Railway.

History 
The station opened on 11 August 1857 by the Leven and East of Fife Railway. To the northwest was a goods yard with a siding. The signal box, which opened in 1907, was on the platform and it closed in 1962. The station closed on 6 September 1965.

References

External links 

Disused railway stations in Fife
Railway stations in Great Britain opened in 1857
Railway stations in Great Britain closed in 1965
Beeching closures in Scotland
1857 establishments in Scotland
1965 disestablishments in Scotland
Kilconquhar